Fariz Hend (also Romanized as Farīz Hend, Farīz Hand, and Ferīz Hand) is a village in Barzrud Rural District, in the Central District of Natanz County, Isfahan Province, Iran. At the 2006 census, its population was 163, in 87 families.

References 

Populated places in Natanz County